Ogeday (born 22 December 1981) is a Turkish rap singer.

Musical career 
He has started his musical career with Respot in 1996. Group toured Turkey, and performed several concerts. He made several commercial jingles, most notably for Avea. He released his debut studio album Rapturka in May 2003. Turkish musician Sezen Aksu also supported this album.

He released his second studio album Mecburi İstikamet in 2006. He made duets with Zara, Işın Karaca and İbrahim Erkal.

Discography 
Rapturka (2003)
Mecburi İstikamet (2006)
Maxi Single (2008) (single; together with Işın Karaca)

Music videos

References

External links
Official Ogeday Myspace
 Ogeday at Ulus müzik
 http://www.ogeday.net via 

1981 births
Turkish male singers
Turkish rappers
Living people
Singers from Istanbul